A safety area is a term from the shooting sports describing a bay with a safe direction where shooters can handle unloaded firearms without the supervision of a Range Officer (RO). Safety areas are widely used in dynamic shooting sport disciplines (e.g. IPSC and PPC 1500), and may for example be used to pack, unpack or holster a gun, cleaning or repair, dry firing and training with empty magazines.

The handling of ammunition is expressly prohibited within the safety area, including any dummy rounds. Outside the safety area ammunition can be handled freely to load magazines, but firearms may only be handled under the direct supervision of a Range Officer. This strict separation of firearms and ammunition prevents accidents like accidental discharge (AD). Violators will be prosecuted as a rule, with immediate disqualification and exclusion from the competition.

References 

Shooting sports